Mimozotale is a genus of longhorn beetles of the subfamily Lamiinae, containing the following species:

subgenus Mimozotale
 Mimozotale flavolineata Breuning, 1951
 Mimozotale javanica Breuning, 1957
 Mimozotale sikkimensis (Breuning, 1940)
 Mimozotale tonkinea Breuning, 1969

subgenus Parazotale
 Mimozotale cylindrica Hayashi, 1981
 Mimozotale longipennis (Pic, 1927)
 Mimozotale minuta (Pic, 1926)

subgenus Trizotale
 Mimozotale flavovittata Breuning, 1975
 Mimozotale trivittata (Pic, 1931)

References

Desmiphorini